Flanders Classics is an official cooperation among the organizers of the classic cycle races held in Flanders, Belgium. It was founded in 2009 and comprises seven races, of which the Tour of Flanders, one of the Monuments of cycling classics, is considered the most prestigious.

Mission
The mission of the Flanders Classics is to ensure the position of the Flemish Classics in the international cycling calendar. By doing this the organization improves the stature of the smaller Flemish races. The cooperation has already achieved a better date for three of the races: Gent–Wevelgem will now be held on the Sunday between Milan–San Remo and the Ronde van Vlaanderen; the Scheldeprijs will be held between the Ronde and Paris–Roubaix; and, the Brabantse Pijl will be held before the Ardennes classics, which consist of the Amstel Gold Race, La Flèche Wallonne and Liège–Bastogne–Liège.

Classics
Cooperating races are:

Results

References

External links

Sports event promotion companies